Mehcad Jason McKinley Brooks (born October 25, 1980) is an American actor and former fashion model. He is known for his roles as Matthew Applewhite in the second season of ABC's series Desperate Housewives (2005–2006), Jerome in The Game, his leading role as Terrance "TK" King in the USA series Necessary Roughness (2011-2013) and James Olsen in the CBS/The CW series Supergirl. In 2022, he began his portrayal of NYPD Detective Jalen Shaw on the NBC police procedural drama Law & Order, with the start of the series' 22nd season.

Early life
Brooks was born and raised in Austin, Texas, where he attended L.C. Anderson High School. Brooks is the son of Austin American-Statesman editorial writer Alberta Phillips and former pro football player Billy Brooks; his stepfather is lawyer Gary Bledsoe. After graduating from high school in 1999, he attended the University of Southern California's School of Cinema-Television.
Brooks mentioned on a September 2010 episode of The Wendy Williams Show that he turned down basketball scholarships and offers from Ivy League schools in favor of going to USC. He then left to pursue an acting career.

Career
Brooks' early work includes being a Calvin Klein underwear model.

From 2005 to 2006, Brooks played the role of Matthew Applewhite on the ABC TV drama Desperate Housewives. He appeared in Glory Road, portraying Harry Flournoy, an athlete at Texas Western University when the five starting black players beat Kentucky for the national championship. He acted in the 2007 film In the Valley of Elah. He starred opposite Tia Mowry as her boyfriend, Jerome, on the TV series The Game in 2008. In 2009 he appeared on FOX's TV series Dollhouse.  Brooks played Benedict "Eggs" Talley in the second season of HBO's True Blood. Beginning January 2010, he appeared as attorney Malcolm Bennet in the now-canceled ABC series The Deep End. He plays the "new boyfriend" in a recent State Farm Insurance television commercial alongside former The Game co-star Gabrielle Dennis.

Brooks appeared in the ABC documentary-style dramedy television series My Generation, which premiered in Fall 2010. The show was canceled after only two episodes. He was among the cast on the USA Network series Necessary Roughness which debuted on June 29, 2011. The show featured Brooks as Terrence "TK" King, a football player for the New York Hawks whose anger issues cause his team to require him to see  therapist. In 2013, Necessary Roughness was cancelled. Brooks guest starred in the Law & Order: Special Victims Unit episode as Prince Miller, a basketball superstar who was molested as a child by his coach, and a guest role on J. J. Abrams' show Alcatraz as a bomb disposal expert. In 2013, Brooks was featured in a public service announcement for the Center for Reproductive Rights.

From the series premiere until his departure in the fourth episode of the fifth season, Brooks played James Olsen on the CBS/The CW drama Supergirl as a series regular.

On October 20, 2017, he released his debut single, "Tears Away".

In 2019, he was announced to portray Jax Briggs for the Mortal Kombat reboot released on April 23, 2021.

In June 2022, it was announced that Brooks would be joining the cast of the long-running crime series Law & Order as a detective in Season 22.

In the media
He appeared in the July 2010 issue of GQ, alongside Emanuela de Paula.

Filmography

Films

Television

Discography

Singles

Awards and nominations

Personal life
He is the son of former NFL wide receiver Billy Brooks.

Brooks has stated in an interview with IGN that he is an avid player of video games, including the Call of Duty, Medal of Honor, and Madden series.

His older brother, Billy Brooks IV, was a regular on the now defunct Spill.com and currently guests on its successor Double Toasted.

He was in a relationship with Creature co-star Serinda Swan until their break-up in 2011.

See also
 List of male underwear models

References

External links
 
 Interview at LIFETEEN.com

1980 births
21st-century American male actors
Male models from Texas
Living people
Male actors from Austin, Texas
USC School of Cinematic Arts alumni
African-American male models
African-American models
American male models
African-American male actors
American male television actors
American male film actors
21st-century African-American people
20th-century African-American people